Gitlow is a surname. Notable people with the surname include:

Benjamin Gitlow (1891–1965), American politician and author
Stuart Gitlow (born 1962), American psychiatrist

See also
Gitlow v. New York